The United States Navy began the construction of battleships with  in 1892, but the first battleship under that designation was . The Navy Act of July 19, 1892 authorized construction of a fourth "sea-going, coast-line battle ship", which became . Despite much later claims that these were to be purely defensive and were authorized as "coastal defense ships", they were almost immediately used for offensive operations in the Spanish–American War. By the start of the 20th century, the United States Navy had in service or under construction the three  and two  battleships, making the United States the world's fifth strongest power at sea from a nation that had been 12th in 1870.

Alaska and Hawaii did not become states until 1959, after the end of battleship building, but the battlecruiser, or "Large Cruiser,"  was built during World War II and her sister, was begun but never completed. The pre-dreadnoughts  (formerly the Austrian ),  (formerly the Austrian ), and the dreadnought USS Ostfriesland (formerly the German SMS Ostfriesland), taken as prizes of war after World War I, were commissioned in the US Navy, but were not assigned hull classification symbols.

No American battleship has ever been lost at sea, though four were sunk during the attack on Pearl Harbor. The hulk of Oklahoma was salvaged and was lost at sea while being towed to the mainland for scrapping. Two American-built pre-dreadnought battleships,  and her sister , were sunk in 1941 by German bombers during their World War II invasion of Greece. The ships had been sold to Greece in 1914, becoming  and  respectively.

1880s–1910s 
Texas and BB-1 to BB-4 were authorized as "coast defense battleships", but Maine was ordered as an armored cruiser and was only re-rated as a "second class battleship" when she turned out too slow to be a cruiser. The next group, BB-5 Kearsarge through BB-25 New Hampshire, followed general global pre-dreadnought design characteristics and entered service between 1900 and 1909. The definitive American pre-dreadnought was the penultimate class of the type, the Connecticut class, sporting the usual four-gun array of  weapons, a very heavy intermediate and secondary battery, and a moderate tertiary battery. They were good sea boats and heavily armed and armored for their type. The final American pre-dreadnought class, the Mississippi-class, were an experiment in increasing numbers with slower ships of limited range. The Navy soon rejected the concept and within 6 years of commissioning, sold these to Greece in 1914 to pay for a new super-dreadnought .

The dreadnoughts, BB-26 South Carolina through BB-35 Texas, commissioned between 1910 and 1914, uniformly possessed twin turrets, introduced the superimposed turret arrangement that would later become standard on all battleships, and had relatively heavy armor and moderate speed. Five of the ten ships used the established vertical triple expansion (VTE) propulsion rather than faster direct-drive turbines, used by the British which had higher fuel consumption. The ships had 8 (South Carolina class), 10 (Delaware and Florida) or 12 (Wyoming class) 12-inch guns, or 10 (New York class)  guns. The dreadnoughts gave good service, the last two classes surviving through World War II before being scrapped. However, they had some faults that were never worked out, and the midships turrets in the ten and twelve-gun ships were located near boilers and high-pressure steam lines, a factor that made refrigeration very difficult and problematic in hot climates. One of their number, Texas (BB-35), is the last remaining American battleship of the pre–World War II era and the only remaining dreadnought in the world.

Next came the twelve Standards, beginning with BB-36 Nevada, commissioned over the period 1914 to 1920. The last ship commissioned was BB-48 West Virginia (BB-49 through 54 were also Standards, but were never commissioned, and scrapped under the Washington Naval Treaty). Oklahoma (BB-37) was the last American battleship commissioned with triple expansion machinery; all the other Standards used either geared steam turbines (Nevada, the Pennsylvania class, Idaho and Mississippi) or turbo-electric propulsion (New Mexico, the Tennessee and Colorado classes). The Standards were a group of ships with four turrets, oil fuel, a  top speed, a  tactical diameter at top speed, and heavy armor distributed on the "All or Nothing" principle. Armament was fairly consistent, starting with ten 14-inch guns in the Nevada class, twelve in the Pennsylvania, New Mexico and Tennessee classes, and eight  guns in the Colorado class.

1930s–1940s 
After the 1930s "builders holiday," the USN commissioned ten more battleships of an entirely new style, the so-called fast battleship. These ships began with BB-55 North Carolina and the last ship laid down was BB-66 Kentucky (the last completed ship was BB-64 Wisconsin). These ships were a nearly clean break from previous American design practices. All ten ships were built to a Panamax design (technically post-Panamax, as they exceeded normal Panamax beam by two feet, but they were still able to transit the canal). They were fast battleships, and could travel with the aircraft carriers at cruising speed (their speed was not intended for that role, but rather so they could run down and destroy enemy battlecruisers). They possessed almost completely homogeneous main armament (nine 16-inch guns in each ship, the sole difference being an increase in length from 45 to 50 calibers with the Iowa-class vessels), very high speed relative to other American designs ( in the North Carolina and South Dakota classes,  in the Iowa class), and moderate armor. The North Carolina class was of particular concern, as their protection was rated as only "adequate" against the 16-inch super-heavy shells. They had been designed with, and armored against, a battery of three quadruple 14-inch guns, then changed to triple 16-inch guns after the escalator clause in the Second London Naval Treaty had been triggered. Secondary armament in these ships was almost homogeneous as well: Except for South Dakota, configured as a flagship, the other nine ships of this group sported a uniform 20-gun 5-inch (127 mm) secondary battery (South Dakota deleted two 5-inch mounts to make room for flag facilities). Visually, the World War II ships are distinguished by their three-turret arrangement and the massive columnar mast that dominates the superstructure. The last ship, Wisconsin (BB-64), commissioned in 1944 (Wisconsin was approved last; however, Missouri (BB-63) was commissioned three months later, due to delays from additional aircraft carrier construction). Missouri (BB-63), famous for being the ship on which the Japanese instrument of surrender was signed, was the last battleship in the world to be decommissioned on 31 March 1992. Seven of these ten ships are still in existence. South Dakota, Washington and Indiana were scrapped, but the remainder are now museum ships. There was intended to be another class of five of these ships, the Montana class (BB-67 Montana through BB-71 Louisiana), but they were cancelled before being laid down in favor of a greater number of aircraft carriers. The Montana-class ships would have been built to a 60,000-ton post-Panamax design, and carried a greater number of guns (twelve 16-inch guns) and heavier armor than the other ships; otherwise they would have been homogeneous with the rest of the World War II battleships.

In October 2006, the last battleships, ( and ), were stricken from the Naval Registry.

Key

Second-class battleship

USS Texas (1892) 

The acquisition of modern, European-built warships by Argentina, Brazil, and Chile had alarmed the United States. The straw that broke the camel's back was Brazil's commissioning of the battleship Riachuelo, which suddenly made the Brazilian Navy the strongest in the Americas. Congressman Hilary A. Herbert, chairman of the House Naval Affairs Committee, said of the situation, "if all this old navy of ours were drawn up in battle array in mid-ocean and confronted by the Riachuelo it is doubtful whether a single vessel bearing the American flag would get into port."

Texas was authorized by Congress on 3 August 1886, but construction lagged until she was laid down on 1 June 1889. She was launched in the presence of the granddaughter of Sam Houston on 28 June 1892, and commissioned on 15 August 1895. Texass early service revealed a number of structural issues, which was addressed via some reinforcement of various parts of the ship, and she ran aground near Newport, Rhode Island, in September 1896.This in turn revealed even more faults with Texas, as massive flooding easily disabled her in the shallow waters where she ran aground. After repairs, she joined the North Atlantic Squadron, briefly leaving for a Gulf Coast visit to Galveston and New Orleans that saw her beached on a mud bank off Galveston, an event whose aftermath gave Texas her nickname, "Old Hoodoo." After repairs, she returned to the North Atlantic Squadron and her patrols of the Eastern Seaboard. In the Spring of 1898, Texass near-sister ship  (the other of the two original coastal defense ships) was destroyed by an explosion in Havana's harbor, and the United States went to war with the Spanish Empire. An American fleet including Texas was at Key West, and was part of the Flying Squadron in its engagements with Spanish fortifications on the Cuban coast. After the war, Texas was decommissioned and refitted on two occasions before finally be declared obsolete in 1911 and permanently decommissioned and converted into a target ship in the same year. On 15 February 1911, Texas was christened as San Marcos to free the name up for the dreadnought , and was then sunk in the waters of Tangier Sound by 's guns. The remains of the San Marcos continued to be used for gunnery practice after her sinking until January 1959, when vast quantities of explosives were used to bury her remains.

Pre-dreadnought battleships

Indiana class

USS Iowa

Kearsarge class 

These two ships were authorized under the Act of 2 March 1895, and were both built by the Newport News Shipbuilding Company.

Illinois class 

 Displacement: 11,565 tons
 Armament: 4 × 13 in (330 mm) (2x2), 14 × 6 in (152 mm) (14x1), 16 × 6 pounders (2.7 kg) (16x1), 6 × 1 pounders (454 g) (6x1), 4 torpedo tubes
 Speed: 17 knots
 Commissioned: 16 October 1900 (Alabama)
 Decommissioned 15 May 1920 (Illinois, Wisconsin)
 Fate: Illinois transferred to New York Naval Militia 1921, renamed Prairie State 1941, scrapped 1956; Alabama sunk as target 1921; Wisconsin scrapped 1922.

Maine class

Virginia class 

 Displacement: 15,000 tons
 Armament: 4 × 12 in (305 mm) (2x2), 8 × 8 in (203 mm) (4x2), 12 × 6 in (152 mm) guns (12x1), 24 1-pounders (24x1), 4 × 21 in (533 mm) torpedo tubes
 Armor: Belt 11 inches; Turret 12 inches; Deck 3 inches
 Speed: 19 knots
 Commissioned: 19 February 1906 (Rhode Island)
 Decommissioned: 13 August 1920 (Virginia)
 Fate: Virginia and New Jersey sunk as targets, remainder sold for scrap, 1923

Connecticut class 

 Displacement: 16,000 tons
 Armament: 4 × 12 in (305 mm) (2x2), 8 × 8 in (203 mm) (4x2), 12 × 7 in (178 mm) (12x1), 10 × 3 in (76 mm) (10x1), 4 × 21 in (533 mm) torpedo tubes
 Armor: 11in Belt / 3in Deck
 Speed: 18 knots
 Commissioned: 2 June 1906 (Louisiana)
 Decommissioned: 1 March 1923 (Connecticut)
 Fate: Scrapped 1923–24

Mississippi class 

 Displacement: 13,000 tons
 Armament: 4 × 12 in (305 mm) (2 × 2), 8 × 8 in (203 mm) (4 × 2), 8 × 7 in (178 mm) (8x1), 12 × 3 in (76 mm) (12 × 1), 6 × 3 pounder gun (6 × 1), 2 × 1-pounder Mark 6 (2 × 1), 6 × .30-caliber machine guns (6 × 1), 2 × 21 in (533 mm) torpedo tubes
 Armor:
 Speed: 17 knots
 Ships in class: 2:  and 
 Commissioned: 1 February 1908 (Mississippi)
 Fate: Decommissioned 30 July 1914 and sold to Greece. Kilkis (ex-Mississippi) and Limnos (ex-Idaho) sunk by German bombers in April 1941.

Dreadnought battleships

South Carolina class 

 Displacement: 16,000 tons
 Armament: 8 × 12 in (305 mm) guns (4 × 2), 22 × 3 in (76 mm) (22x1), 2 × 3 pounder (2 × 1), 2 × 21 in (533 mm) torpedo tubes
 Armor: 12” belt, 2.5" deck
 Speed: 18 knots
 Ships in class: 2:  and 
 Commissioned: 4 January 1910 (Michigan)
 Decommissioned: 11 February 1922 (Michigan)
 Fate: Scrapped 1924

Delaware class 

 Displacement: 20,380 tons
 Armament: 10 × 12 in (305 mm) (5x2), 14 × 5 in (127 mm) (14x1), 22 × 3 in (76 mm) (22x1), 2 × 3 pounder (2x1) guns, 2 × 21 in (533 mm) torpedo tubes
 Armor:
 Speed: 21 knots
 Ships in class: 2:  and 
 Commissioned: 4 April 1910 (Delaware)
 Decommissioned: 22 November 1923 (North Dakota)
 Fate: Delaware scrapped 1924; North Dakota converted to target ship 1924, scrapped 1931

Florida class 

 Displacement: 21,800 tons
 Armament: 10 × 12 in (305 mm) (5x2), 16 × 5 in (127 mm) (16x1), 2 × 21 in (533 mm) torpedo tubes
 Armor:
 Speed: 21 knots
 Ships in class: 2:  and 
 Commissioned: 31 August 1911 (Utah)
 Decommissioned: 16 February 1931 (Florida)
 Fate: Florida scrapped in 1932, Utah became target ship (AG-16) in 1931, sunk at Pearl Harbor in 1941

Wyoming class 

 Displacement: 26,000 tons
 Armament: 12 × 12 in (305 mm) (6x2), 21 × 5 in (127 mm) (21x1), two 3-inch (3x1), 2 × 21 in (533 mm) torpedo tubes
 Armor: 11in Belt / 2in Deck
 Speed: 20.5 knots
 Ships in class: 2:  and 
 Commissioned: 17 September 1912 (Arkansas)
 Decommissioned: 1 August 1947 (Wyoming)
 Fate: Wyoming became a training ship (AG-17) in 1931, scrapped in 1947. Arkansas sunk at Operation Crossroads in 1946

New York class 

 Displacement: 27,200 tons
 Armament: 10 × 14 in (356 mm) (5x2), 21 5-inch (21x1), two 3-inch (2x1), 2 × 21 in (533 mm) torpedo tubes
 Armor: 12in Belt
 Speed: 21 knots
 Ships in class: 2:  and 
 Commissioned: 12 March 1914 (Texas)
 Decommissioned: 21 April 1948 (Texas)
 Fate: New York sunk as target 1948; Texas preserved as a memorial 1948

Standard-type battleships

The so-called "Standard-type" was a series of battleships ordered between 1911 and 1916, and incorporating a number of new features including "all or nothing" armor. Twelve of these battleships were constructed across five classes, and were commissioned between 1916 and 1923.

Nevada class 

 Displacement: 27,500 tons
 Armament: 10 × 14 in (356 mm) (2x3, 2x2), 21 × 5 in (127 mm) (21x1), 4 × 21 in (533 mm) torpedo tubes
 Armor:13.5in Belt / 2.9in Deck
 Speed: 20 knots
 Ships in class: 2:  and 
 Commissioned: 11 March 1916 (Nevada)
 Decommissioned: 29 August 1946 (Nevada)
 Fate: Nevada sunk as target 1948; Oklahoma sunk at Pearl Harbor in 1941, raised and stripped of salvageable parts, sunk en route to scrapping 1947

Pennsylvania class 

 Displacement: 31,400 tons
 Armament: 12 × 14 in (356 mm) (4x3), 22 × 5 in (127 mm) (22x1), 4 × 3 in (76 mm) (4x1), 2 × 21 in (533 mm) torpedo tubes
 Armor: 13.5in Belt / 3in Deck
 Speed: 21 knots
 Ships in class: 2:  and 
 Commissioned: both in 1916
 Fate: Pennsylvania sunk after Operation Crossroads in 1946, Arizona destroyed at Pearl Harbor in 1941, designated as a memorial.

New Mexico class 

 Displacement: 32,000 tons
 Armament: 12 × 14 in (356 mm) (4x3), 14 × 5 in (127 mm) (14x1), 2 × 21 in (533 mm) torpedo tubes
 Armor: 13.5in Belt / 3.5in Deck
 Speed: 21 knots
 Commissioned: 18 December 1917 (Mississippi)
 Decommissioned: 17 September 1956 (Mississippi)
 Fate: New Mexico & Idaho scrapped 1947; Mississippi converted to trials ship (AG-128) 1946, scrapped 1956

Tennessee class 

 Displacement: 32,300 tons
 Armament: 12 × 14 in (356 mm) (4x3), 14 × 5 in (127 mm) (14x1), 2 × 21 in (533 mm) torpedo tubes
 Armor: 13.5in Belt / 3.5in Deck
 Speed: 21 knots
 Ships in class: 2: , and 
 Commissioned: 3 June 1920 (Tennessee)
 Decommissioned: 14 February 1947 (both)
 Fate: sold for scrap 1959

Colorado class 

 Displacement: 32,600 tons
 Armament: 8 × 16 in (406 mm) (4x2), 12 × 5 in (127 mm) (12x1), 8 × 3 in (76 mm) (8x1), 2 × 21 in (533 mm) torpedo tubes
 Armor:13.5in Belt / 3.5in Deck
 Speed: 21 knots
 Commissioned: Maryland in 1921, Colorado and West Virginia in 1923, Washington not completed and sunk as target
 Fate: Remaining three decommissioned 1947 and sold for scrap 1959.

South Dakota class (1920) 

 Displacement: 43,200 tons
 Armament: 12 × 16 in (406 mm) (4x3), 16 × 6 in (152 mm) (16x1), 8 × 3 in (76 mm) (8x1), 2 × 21 in (533 mm) torpedo tubes
 Armor: 13.5in Belt / 4.75in Deck
 Speed: 23 knots
 Fate: Because of the Washington Naval Treaty, all were cancelled and scrapped on their slips prior to launch in 1923.

Fast battleships

The term "fast battleship" was applied to new designs in the early 1910s incorporating propulsion technology that allowed for higher speeds without sacrificing armour protection. The US Navy began introducing fast battleships into service following the Second London Naval Treaty of 1936, with a total of ten across three classes entering service.

North Carolina class 

 Displacement: 35,000 tons
 Armament: 9 × 16 in (406 mm) (3x3), 20 × 5 in (127 mm) (10x2), 16 × 1.1 inch AA (4x4)
 Armor: 12in Belt / 7in Deck
 Speed: 28 knots
 Ships in class: 2:  and 
 Commissioned: 1941
 Fate: North Carolina preserved as memorial 1965; Washington scrapped 1962

South Dakota class (1939) 

 Displacement: 38,000 tons
 Armament: 9 × 16 in (406 mm) (3×3), 20 (16 on South Dakota) × 5 inch (10 or 8 × 2), up to 68 × 40 mm AA (17 × 4), up to 76 × 20 mm AA (76x1), 3 aircraft
 Armor: 12.2in Belt / 7.5in Deck
 Speed: 27 knots
 Commissioned: 1942
 Fate: South Dakota and Indiana scrapped 1962 and 1963 respectively; Alabama preserved as memorial 1964; Massachusetts preserved as memorial 1965

Iowa class 

 Displacement: 48,500 tons
 Armament: 9 × 16 in (406 mm) (3x3), 20 × 5 in (127 mm) (10x2), 80 × 40 mm AA (20x4), 49 × 20 mm AA (49x1) (1980s modification added 32 × Tomahawk and 16 × Harpoon missiles and 4 × Phalanx CIWS, and deleted 8 5-in guns and all other light anti-aircraft gun systems)
 Armor: 12in Belt / 7.5in Deck
 Speed: 33 knots
 Commissioned: Four commissioned; first, Iowa 1943; last, Missouri 1944.
 Fate: Iowa preserved as memorial in San Pedro, California; Missouri preserved as memorial at Pearl Harbor, Hawaii; Wisconsin preserved as memorial in Norfolk, Virginia; New Jersey preserved as memorial in Camden, NJ; Illinois cancelled and scrapped on slip (bell currently at the University of Illinois at Urbana–Champaign's Memorial Stadium (Champaign), home of the Illinois Fighting Illini football team, traditionally rung when the Illini score a touchdown); Kentucky launched 1950, not completed, scrapped 1958.

Montana class 

 Displacement: 65,000 tons
 Armament: 12 × 16 in (406 mm) (4x3), 20 × 5 in (127 mm) (10x2), undesignated number of 40 mm and 20 mm
 Armor: 16in Belt / 8.2in Deck
 Speed: 28 knots
 Fate: All cancelled in 1943 before being laid down

See also 
 List of battleships
 List of US Navy ships sunk or damaged in action during World War II § Battleships (BB)
 Timeline of battleships of the United States Navy

Notes

Footnotes

Citations

References

Dictionary of American Naval Fighting Ships

Journals 

 
 ; cited in

Publications

Online resources

External links 
Memorials
 USS Arizona (BB-39) - Pearl Harbor National Memorial, HI
 USS Utah (ex-BB-31) - Pearl Harbor National Memorial, HI
Museum ships
 USS Alabama (BB-60) - Battleship Memorial Park, Mobile, AL
 USS Iowa (BB-61) – USS Iowa Museum, Los Angeles, CA
 USS Massachusetts (BB-59) - Battleship Cove, Fall River, MA
 USS Missouri (BB-63), Pearl Harbor, HI
 USS New Jersey (BB-62), Camden, NJ
 USS North Carolina (BB-55), Wilmington, NC
 USS Texas (BB-35) - Battleship Texas Foundation
 USS Wisconsin (BB-64) - Nauticus, Norfolk VA

Battleships of the United States Navy
 
Battleships
United S
Battleships list